Mohammad Mustafa may refer to:

 Mohammad Mustafa, one of the names used to refer to the Islamic prophet Muhammad
 Mohammad Mustafa (economist) (born 1954), former Deputy Prime Minister of Palestine
 Mohammad Mustafa (footballer, born 1989), Jordanian footballer
 Mohammad Mustafa (footballer, born 2000), Iraqi footballer
 Mohammad Musthafa Shaik aka Mohammad Mustafa, Andhra Pradesh politician of India
 Mohammad Mustafa (alias), the purported Norwegian author of a controversial 1987 letter, the Mustafa Letter
Mohamed Mustafa, Sudanese footballer
Muhammad Mustafá Baghdádí, Iraqi adherent of the Baháʼí faith

See also
 Mustafa Mohammad (born 1968) bodybuilder
 Muhammad (disambiguation)
 Mustafa (disambiguation)